Kozağaç is a village in the District of Beypazarı in Ankara Province in central Turkey.

References

Villages in Beypazarı District